Gibeon  (Nama: Khaxa-tsûs) is a constituency in the Hardap Region of Namibia. The administrative centre of the constituency is the village of Gibeon. It had a population of 12,122 in 2011, up from 11,541 in 2001.

In August 2013, Gibeon Constituency lost the western part of its territory, which became a constituency of its own, namely Daweb Constituency.  the constituency had 3,951 registered voters.

Politics
The 2015 regional elections were won by Jeremias van Neel of Swapo with 1,255 votes. Niklaas Jacobus Dawson of the Rally for Democracy and Progress (RDP) came second with 206 votes, followed by Geoffrey Keramen of the Democratic Turnhalle Alliance (DTA) with 122 votes. The 2020 regional election was narrowly won by Paul Isaak of the Landless People's Movement (LPM, a new party registered in 2018). He obtained 890 votes. The sitting councillor van Neel (SWAPO) came second with 769 votes.

References

External links

Constituencies of Hardap Region
States and territories established in 1992
1992 establishments in Namibia